Grays or Greys may refer to:

Places
 Grays Bay, Nunavut, Canada
 Grays, Essex, a town in Essex, England
 Grays railway station
 Grays School
 Grays, Kent, a hamlet in Kent, England
 Rotherfield Greys or Greys, a village in Oxfordshire, England
 Grays, Washington, an unincorporated community in Washington, United States

Sports
 Grays International, a UK-based sports company
 Homestead Grays, Negro league baseball dynasty
 Louisville Grays, one of the original eight members of the National League
 Los Angeles Dodgers, a baseball team in California, United States
 Providence Grays, a Major League Baseball team that folded in 1885
 Providence Grays (minor league), several minor league baseball teams between 1886 and 1949

Other uses
 Gray or grey, an achromatic color
 Gray (unit), a unit of measurement of ionizing radiation
 Grey aliens or Greys, a supposed race of extraterrestrials
 Royal Scots Greys, a cavalry regiment of the British Army from 1707 to 1971
 The Grays, the Confederate States of America's armed forces

See also
 Grais (disambiguation)
 Graze (disambiguation)
 Grey (disambiguation)